East Grand Bahama is a district of the Bahamas, situated on the eastern part of the island of Grand Bahama.

The local government seat for the district is in the settlement of High Rock, a fairly small town. Other settlements of East Grand Bahama include Rocky Creek, Pelican Point, Gambier Point and Sweeting Cay.

For many years the United States Air Force maintained a missile tracking station near High Rock, which was used mainly in connection with all launches from Cape Canaveral FL and NASA's crewed space flights. The station was used as a base of operations for a film studio, Gold Rock Creek Enterprises, where filming took place for the Disney production of Pirates of the Caribbean: Dead Man's Chest and Pirates of the Caribbean: At World's End. The Bahamas Film Studios has one of the largest open water filming enclosures in the world, along with production offices and support facilities, such as property warehouses, wardrobe workshops and other covered space. The studio is still in development and will eventually add state-of-the-art sound stages, post-production facilities and a hands-on international film school.

External links
Film Studio Bahamas Website
Bahamas Film Commission

Districts of the Bahamas
Grand Bahama